Season 2 of Project Runway Malaysia featured 15 fashion designers from Malaysia competing to be the best designer.

The judges for the first season were Bernie Chan, Datuk Bernard Chandran, Asiah Mion (editor EH! Magazine), Seema Visamanathan (editor Female Magazine), Wirda Adnan (Chief Editor, Glam Magazine) and Aster Lim (Managing Editor, Female, Marie Claire, Men's Health and Seventeen magazines). There are also guest judges through the season.

The contestants

Season 02